Selçuklu Belediyesi Sport Hall is a multi-purpose sport indoor venue that is located in the Selçuklu district of Konya, Turkey. The hall, with a capacity for 3,800 spectators, was built in 2007. It is home to Torku Konyaspor, which plays currently in the Turkish Basketball League.

The sports hall hosted the handball and the kickboxing competitions at the 2021 Islamic Solidarity Games.

References

Sports venues completed in 2007
Indoor arenas in Turkey
Basketball venues in Turkey
Handball venues in Turkey
2007 establishments in Turkey
Sports venues in Konya
Selçuklu District